The 2006 California State Senate elections were held on  November 7, 2006. Voters in the 20 even-numbered districts of the California State Senate voted for their representatives. The California Democratic Party retained its majority and its 25 seats. The California Republican Party retained control of the remaining 15 seats. Neither party lost nor gained any seats.

Overview

Results
Final results from the California Secretary of State:

District 2

District 4

District 6

District 8

District 10

District 12

District 14

District 16

District 18

District 20

District 22

District 24

District 26

District 28

District 30

District 32

District 34

District 36

District 38

District 40

See also
California State Assembly elections, 2006
California state elections, 2006

References

Senate
California
2006